Arnt Ferdinand Moss (February 1880 – 25 April 1964) was a Norwegian accountant and politician.

Biography
Moss was born at Sundby in Strøm parish, Sør-Odal, Norway.
He was the son of Anton Jacob Fredriksen Moss (1848-1916) and Kari Pedersdatter Lilleseth (1849-1927). He attended the non - commissioned officer school   (Underoffisersskolar)  at Oslo in 1901 and was a non-commissioned officer (Underoffiser) in 1902.
He was treasurer of Drammen Gasworks 1911-1918. From 1918-21, he was  business manager in  A/S Fremtiden. In 1921 he took a position as municipal auditor in Drammen and from 1946 he was chief auditor in the municipality until he retired.

He was elected s a representative of Hønefoss, Drammen and Kongsberg to the Storting for the periods 1934–1936 and 1937–1945 with the Labour Party.

References

1880 births
Year of death missing
People from Sør-Odal
Labour Party (Norway) politicians
Members of the Storting
Norwegian accountants